Terrence Edwards (born April 20, 1979) is a former Canadian football wide receiver who played for nine seasons with the Winnipeg Blue Bombers and Montreal Alouettes of the Canadian Football League. He was originally signed by the Atlanta Falcons as an undrafted free agent in 2003. He played college football at Georgia.

He is the younger brother of Robert Edwards, a former first-round pick of the New England Patriots and a former member of the Toronto Argonauts and Montreal Alouettes.

College career
Like his older brother, Terrence Edwards attended the University of Georgia, where he played from 1999 to 2002. In his career, he caught 204 passes for 3,093 yards and 30 touchdowns. He left Georgia holding the SEC record for career receiving yards, a record that stood until Jordan Matthews broke it in 2013. As of 2023, his 204 receptions rank tenth all-time in the conference. As a senior in 2002, he caught 59 passes for 1,004 yards and 11 touchdowns.

Professional career

Atlanta Falcons
After going undrafted in the 2003 NFL Draft, Edwards signed with the Atlanta Falcons on April 29, 2003. Despite missing the team's final preseason game due to injury, Edwards made the team out of training camp. He was active for six games during the regular season, making his debut on September 28 against the Carolina Panthers. His first and only NFL reception to date came on November 30—a 10-yard grab against the Houston Texans from quarterback Doug Johnson.

A groin injury sidelined Edwards during most of the 2004 preseason, and he was released prior to the regular season. He has yet to reappear in the NFL, and his career stats include one reception for ten yards, one punt return for two yards, and one solo tackle.

CFL career
After spending the 2004 NFL season out of football, Edwards signed with the Toronto Argonauts of the Canadian Football League and went to training camp with the team. He was later released and picked up by the Montreal Alouettes later in the season, for whom he caught six passes for 44 yards in two games.

In 2006 with Montreal, Edwards caught 33 passes for 393 yards and a touchdown. He also carried the ball twice for 18 yards.

Edwards signed with the Winnipeg Blue Bombers on May 24, 2007. This would prove to be his breakout season in the CFL, as he was the league's fifth leading receiver in receptions (80), second in yards (1,280) and tied for second in touchdown receptions (9). He then won his third East Division All-Star award for his performances during the 2011 Winnipeg Blue Bombers season. Despite being 33 years old when the 2012 season begins, Edwards continued production and quality leadership lead the Bombers to extend his contract for an additional 2 years on April 16, 2012.

On February 18, 2014, Edwards announced his retirement from professional football.

Statistics

References

External links
Winnipeg Blue Bombers bio

1979 births
Living people
African-American players of Canadian football
American football wide receivers
American players of Canadian football
Atlanta Falcons players
Canadian football wide receivers
Georgia Bulldogs football players
Montreal Alouettes players
People from Tennille, Georgia
Players of American football from Georgia (U.S. state)
Winnipeg Blue Bombers players
21st-century African-American sportspeople
20th-century African-American sportspeople